IgG4-related skin disease is the recommended name for skin manifestations in IgG4-related disease (IgG4-RD). Multiple different skin manifestations have been described.

Classification
Although a clear understanding of the various skin lesions in IgG4-related disease is a work in progress, skin lesions have been classified into subtypes based on documented cases:
 Angiolymphoid hyperplasia with eosinophilia (or lesions that mimic it) and cutaneous pseudolymphoma
 Cutaneous plasmacytosis
 Eyelid swelling (as part of Mikulicz's disease)
 Psoriasis-like eruptions
 Unspecified maculopapular or erythematous eruptions
 Hypergammaglobulinemic purpura and urticarial vasculitis
 Impaired blood supply to fingers or toes, leading to Raynaud's phenomenon or gangrene

In addition, Wells syndrome has also been reported in a case of IgG4-related disease.

See also
 IgG4-related disease

Note
Note:

References

IgG4-related disease